Gavin Heslop (born November 13, 1997) is an American football cornerback who is a free agent. Heslop played college football at Stony Brook.

Early life and high school 
Heslop was born in Yonkers, New York. He attended Archbishop Stepinac High School in White Plains, New York, the same high school as his future college teammates including quarterback Tyquell Fields and cornerback TJ Morrison. Heslop was named to the NYSSWA First-team All-New York State, as well as the USA Today All-New York team. Heslop played a large role in Stepinac's 2014 CHSFL AAA championship team, the school's first since 1955, recording 60 tackles, three interceptions and three sacks a senior while rushing for 440 yards and six touchdowns. In 2014, Heslop also had a 68-yard interception returned for a touchdown to help Stepinac defeat rival St. Anthony's High School for the first time since 1983.

College career 
Heslop redshirted during the 2015 season. During his freshman season in 2016, he played in eight games and recorded 13 total tackles. In his college debut on September 1 against No. 19 North Dakota, Heslop blocked a punt in the fourth quarter that was returned for a touchdown, giving Stony Brook the 13–9 victory. Heslop also recorded six tackles in a 42–14 upset of No. 2 Richmond.

In his 2017 sophomore season, Heslop started all 13 games at cornerback. He set career highs with 72 tackles, including 8.5 tackles for loss. Heslop recorded his first career sack and forced fumble on October 14 against No. 12 New Hampshire. Heslop recorded a career-high 12 tackles in a 59–29 victory over Lehigh in the first round of the 2017 FCS Playoffs. The following week against James Madison in the second round, Heslop recorded another 10 tackles in a 26–7 loss.

Heslop again started all 12 games at cornerback as a junior in 2018. He was named to the Second-team All-CAA after a season with 59 tackles, 38 of which being solo tackles. On September 22 against Richmond, Heslop recovered a fumble and returned it 87 yards for a touchdown. It was Heslop's first career touchdown and Stony Brook's first fumble recovery for a touchdown since 2016.

Prior to his senior season, Heslop was named one of three Stony Brook team captains. Heslop started all 12 games in 2019, ending his Stony Brook career having started 37 consecutive games. He was named to the Third-team All-CAA with 52 tackles, 8.5 tackles for loss, two blocked kicks, three forced fumbles, three fumble recoveries and one fumble recovery for a touchdown.

Professional career

Seattle Seahawks

2020
Heslop signed with the Seattle Seahawks following the 2020 NFL Draft as an undrafted free agent. He missed most of training camp with an injury. He was waived during final roster cuts on September 5, 2020, and signed to the practice squad the next day. Heslop was elevated to the active roster on October 3 for the team's week 4 game against the Miami Dolphins, and reverted to the practice squad after the game. On January 11, 2021, Heslop signed a reserve/futures contract with the Seahawks.

2021
In the first week of preseason during the 2021 season, Heslop played 33 snaps, including 12 on special teams. He was waived on August 31, 2021 and re-signed to the practice squad. Heslop was elevated to the active roster on November 20 and made his NFL debut on November 21 against the Arizona Cardinals, playing four snaps on special teams. On Monday Night Football against the Washington Football Team on November 29, Heslop recovered an onside kick with Seattle down 17–15, but the play was called back due to an illegal formation penalty on another Seahawks player. He was signed to the active roster on December 10 after Jamal Adams was ruled out for the season.

On December 12 against the Houston Texans, Heslop suffered a broken fibula and tibia in the final minute of the game after coming in to take his first career regular season defensive snaps. He remained in Houston to receive surgery the next day, which head coach Pete Carroll described as "successful". He was placed on injured reserve on December 15.

New York Giants
On July 22, 2022, the New York Giants signed Heslop. He was released on August 16.

Carolina Panthers
On October 19, 2022, the Carolina Panthers signed Heslop to their practice squad.

Personal life 
Heslop is cousins with former NFL player Doug Hogue, who played for the Detroit Lions and the Carolina Panthers from 2011 to 2012.

References

External links 
Seattle Seahawks bio
Stony Brook Seawolves bio

1997 births
Living people
American football cornerbacks
New York Giants players
Players of American football from New York (state)
Seattle Seahawks players
Sportspeople from Yonkers, New York
Stony Brook Seawolves football players
Archbishop Stepinac High School alumni
Carolina Panthers players